James Swann (born ) is a New Zealand male weightlifter, competing in the 85 kg category and representing New Zealand at international competitions. He competed at world championships, most recently at the 1999 World Weightlifting Championships.

Major results

References

1974 births
Living people
New Zealand male weightlifters
Place of birth missing (living people)
20th-century New Zealand people
21st-century New Zealand people